Mnjikaning First Nation 32 is an Anishinaabe reserve in Simcoe County, Ontario. It is the main reserve of the Chippewas of Rama First Nation.

References

External links
 Indigenous and Northern Affairs Canada profile
 Canada Lands Survey System

Anishinaabe reserves in Ontario
Communities in Simcoe County